Paramelita is a genus of crustacean in family Paramelitidae, containing the following species:

Paramelita aurantius (K. H. Barnard, 1927)
Paramelita barnardi Thurston, 1973
Paramelita capensis (K. H. Barnard, 1916)
Paramelita flexa Griffiths, 1981
Paramelita granulicornis (K. H. Barnard, 1927)
Paramelita kogelensis (K. H. Barnard, 1927)
Paramelita magna Stewart & Griffiths, 1992
Paramelita magnicornis Stewart & Griffiths, 1992
Paramelita nigroculus (K. H. Barnard, 1916)
Paramelita odontophora Stewart, Snaddon & Griffiths, 1994
Paramelita parva Stewart & Griffiths, 1992
Paramelita persetosus (K. H. Barnard, 1927)
Paramelita pillicornis Stewart & Griffiths, 1992
Paramelita pinnicornis Stewart & Griffiths, 1992
Paramelita platypus Stewart & Griffiths, 1992
Paramelita seticornis (K. H. Barnard, 1927)
Paramelita spinicornis (K. H. Barnard, 1927)
Paramelita triangula Griffiths & Stewart, 1996
Paramelita tulbaghensis (K. H. Barnard, 1927)
Paramelita validicornis Stewart & Griffiths, 1992

References

Gammaridea
Taxonomy articles created by Polbot